Myrmeanthrenus frontalis is a species of beetle in the family Dermestidae, the only species in the genus Myrmeanthrenus.

References

Dermestidae genera
Monotypic Bostrichiformia genera